The Kagawa clan was a minor Japanese clan. During the Sengoku period (1467–1615), the Kagawa had strong bonds with the powerful Chōsokabe clan, receiving members of the Chōsokabe family for adoptive survival. The clan died out after the Chōsokabe fatally rebelled against the Tokugawa Shogunate in the early 17th century.

References

The Samurai Sourcebook

Kagawa clan